Estonia competed at the 2022 World Aquatics Championships in Budapest, Hungary from 18 June to 3 July.

Open water swimming

Men

Swimming 

 Men

 Women

Mixed

References 

Nations at the 2022 World Aquatics Championships
World Aquatics Championships
2022